Rick Resa is a paralympic athlete from the United States competing mainly in category C2 events.

Resa competed in the 1984 Summer Paralympics in athletics and swimming. In swimming, he won a gold medal in Men's 25 m Freestyle with Aids C1.

References

Paralympic track and field athletes of the United States
Paralympic swimmers of the United States
Athletes (track and field) at the 1984 Summer Paralympics
Swimmers at the 1984 Summer Paralympics
Paralympic gold medalists for the United States
Living people
Year of birth missing (living people)
Medalists at the 1984 Summer Paralympics
Paralympic medalists in swimming
American male freestyle swimmers